The men's pole vault at the 2013 Asian Athletics Championships was held at the Shree Shiv Chhatrapati Sports Complex on 7 July.

Results

References
Results

Pole
Pole vault at the Asian Athletics Championships